10 Years is a compilation album by Dutch DJ and record producer Armin van Buuren. It was released on 11 November 2006 by Armada Music. It spent twelve weeks on the Dutch album chart, peaking at number 45. It also spent five weeks on the Billboard Top Dance/Electronic Albums chart, peaking at number 20.

Van Buuren said that 10 Years was "not a 'best of' album", but "more a selection of previously unreleased and exclusive re-mixes". He also said that the album's main purposes were "tying up loose ends" and "a little celebration of 10 years work as a producer".

Track listing

References

Armin van Buuren compilation albums
2006 greatest hits albums
Armada Music compilation albums